The Bombardier Double-deck Coach is a bilevel passenger railcar currently manufactured by Alstom, which acquired Bombardier Transportation in 2021 (and before that by Adtranz and DWA/Waggonbau Görlitz) used by various European railways and Israel Railways. The current generation of double-deck coaches can be run at speeds up to 200 km/h (125 mph). Depending on their configuration, each coach can seat 100 to 150 passengers.

History
The ancestry of these coaches can be traced back to the LBE double-deck coaches (de:Doppelstock-Stromlinien-Wendezug der LBE) built by WUMAG at Görlitz for the Lübeck–Büchen–Hamburg railway in 1935–36. They were push-pull trains with a cab car that could control the steam locomotive at the other end of the train.

After World War II, these coaches were developed further by VEB Waggonbau Görlitz (formerly WUMAG) into double-deck trains of two to five articulated cars sharing bogies, known as "Doppelstock(glieder)züge" (de:Gliederzug (Schiene)). West german railways now opted only for single level coaches.

Starting in 1974, single coaches were built again that were the direct ancestors of today's double-deck coaches. These trainsets were used by Deutsche Reichsbahn (East Germany) as well as several other railways of the eastern bloc in large numbers (about 4000). After 1990, VEB Waggonbau Görlitz became part of Deutsche Waggonbau AG (DWA) which was acquired by Bombardier Transportation in 1998. Bombardier Inc. sold their railway division to Alstom in 2021.

First Generation 
Build years 1973–1974 and 1976–1991, sold to East Germany, Bulgaria, Poland, Romania, Czechoslovakia. In Czech Republic also known as UIC type Bmto292 (cz) and in Poland as UIC type Bmnopux/Bmteeo (pl), also nicknamed "bohun". Some Polish units refurbished by Pesa Bydgoszcz from 2003–2009 and some Czech units refurbished 2001–2022.

Second Generation 
Build years 1992-1993 for Germany (Deutsche Reichsbahn and Deutsche Bundesbahn), later named DB Class 760.

Third Generation 
Built between 1994 and 1997 under the DWA brand for Germany (Deutsche Bahn).

Fourth Generation 
Built since 1997 and sold under the Bombardier brand to railways in Germany, Denmark, Israel and others.

Fifth Generation 

In 2008 Bombardier presented the "Dosto 2010" future family of double-deck trains for the German market. For international sales they were branded as Bombardier TWINDEXX with a "Vario" concept (then called TWINDEXX Vario) that allows these trains to be built for regional or intercity connections with a design speed of 189 km/h and an operational speed of up to 160 km/h. The high-speed rail versions are branded TWINDEXX Express, designed for 230 km/h. A tilting variant of the Twindexx with an operational speed of up to 200 km/h is developed for the Swiss Federal Railways named SBB RABe 502, informally called TWINDEXX Swiss Express. Orders have been placed in the range of a few hundred coaches of the different variants with their initial delivery expected to be during 2015–2017, depending on the variant.

The National Railway Company of Belgium (NMBS/SNCB) has similarly ordered TWINDEXX-derived intercity trains designated as M7 in 2018, constructed at the former BN factory at Bruges, which entered service in January 2020.

In 2007, the Mazovian Railways signed a contract for the delivery of 37 Twindexx Vario wagons (11 steering and 26 trailing wagons). The centre wagons were delivered in August and the steering wagons in December 2008. Initially, the wagons were pulled by EU07 locomotives. The wagons are currently operated by the Mazovian Railways together with TRAXX P160DC and Pesa Gama locomotives, sometimes also in multiple working with Pesa Sundeck bilevel coaches.

References

External links 
 Double-deck trains at Bombardier's official site

Bombardier Transportation rail vehicles
Railway coaches of Denmark
Railway coaches of Germany
Railway coaches of Israel
Railway coaches of Switzerland
Double-decker rail vehicles